Björkö or Bohus-Björkö is a locality situated in Öckerö Municipality, Västra Götaland County, Sweden with 1,427 inhabitants in 2010.

Sports
The following sports clubs are located in Björkö:

 IFK Björkö

References 

Populated places in Västra Götaland County
Populated places in Öckerö Municipality